Kapren is a city and a municipality in Bundi district in the Indian state of Rajasthan.

Demographics
Kapren is a Municipality city in district of Bundi, Rajasthan. The Kapren city is divided into 20 wards for which elections are held every 5 years. The Kapren Municipality has population of 20,748 of which 10,758 are males while 9,990 are females as per report released by Census India 2011.

Population of Children with age of 0-6 is 2748 which is 13.24% of total population of Kaprain (M). In Kapren Municipality, Female Sex Ratio is of 929 against state average of 928. Moreover, Child Sex Ratio in Kapren is around 882 compared to Rajasthan state average of 888. Literacy rate of Kapren city is 73.45% higher than state average of 66.11%. In Kapren, Male literacy is around 85.86% while female literacy rate is 60.19%.
 
In 1938 it was home to a king named Raja Bhanwar Shingh, who attempted to protect Kapren from the East India Tea Company.

A famous temple of God narsingh bhagwan is located at the mid of the town.

Kapren PIN code is 323301 and STD code is 07438.
Railway station distance is 3.5km in kapren city.

Climate
The prevailing climate in Kapren is known as a local steppe climate. During the year there is little rainfall. The average annual temperature is 26.6 °C in Kapren. In a year, the average rainfall is 724 mm.

The driest month is February. There is 1 mm of precipitation in February. Most of the precipitation here falls in August, averaging 265 mm.

With an average of 35.6 °C, May is the warmest month. January is the coldest month, with temperatures averaging 17.1 °C.

References

 

Cities and towns in Bundi district